National Milk Laboratory Certification Program — Under a Memorandum of Understanding with the National Conference on Interstate Milk Shipments, the Food and Drug Administration (FDA) conducts a national certification program for state centralized laboratories that test dairy products for contaminants and residues. FDA maintains accreditation of milk laboratories and sample collection surveillance procedures by making triennial on-site evaluations of laboratory facilities and equipment and by testing annually the performance skills of analysts. The FDA also standardizes, evaluates, and certifies state and territorial milk laboratory evaluation officers and state sampling surveillance officers.

References 

Food and Drug Administration